Joseph or Joe Gardner may refer to:
 Joe Gardner (musician), jazz trumpeter
 Joseph Gardner (physician) (1752–1794), American physician, delegate for Pennsylvania to the Continental Congress
 Joe C. Gardner (1944–2013), American politician
 Joseph Gardner (murderer) (1970–2008), American convicted murderer and fugitive

See also
 Joseph Gardner House, historic house in Swansea, Massachusetts
 Joseph Gardner Swift (1783–1865), American soldier
 Joseph G. Wilson (Joseph Gardner Wilson, 1826–1873), American Republican politician